Artem Sergeevich Kovalev (born 27 June 2003) is a Russian figure skater. He is the 2019 CS Ice Star silver medalist and the 2019 Volvo Open Cup champion.

Programs

Competitive highlights 
GP: Grand Prix; CS: Challenger Series; JGP: Junior Grand Prix

References

External links 
 
 

2003 births
Living people
Russian male figure skaters
Figure skaters from Moscow